The 2012 Saskatchewan Roughriders season was the 55th season for the team in the Canadian Football League. The Roughriders finished the season in 3rd place in the West Division with an 8–10 record, improving upon their 5–13 record from 2011. The Roughriders qualified for the playoffs and lost to the Calgary Stampeders in the Western Semi-Final.

During the off-season, the Roughriders hired Corey Chamblin as their head coach after Ken Miller had retired.

Offseason
On December 15, 2011, Riders hired new head coach Corey Chamblin. On March 22, 2012, Riders traded their 2nd and 4th round picks in the Canadian College Draft to the Winnipeg Blue Bombers for Odell Willis. The Roughriders also signed soon-to-be all star and former National Football League running back Kory Sheets while also signing three quarterbacks in February.

CFL draft
The 2012 CFL Draft took place on May 3, 2012 live at 1:00 PM CST. The Roughriders had the first overall draft pick and four selections total in the six-round draft, after trading away their second, fourth, and fifth round picks and acquiring Calgary's fifth round pick.

Preseason

Regular season
Under the direction of Corey Chamblin, the Roughriders were leading 3–0 going into their game against Calgary, having beaten Hamilton, Edmonton and BC. Kory Sheets had already scored three touchdowns in consecutive games, and Weston Dressler was starting off strong. Roughriders kick returner Tristan Jackson returned a missed field goal by Paul McCallum, the first Rider to return a kick return since 2007.

The Roughriders then began losing close games, losing in overtime in Calgary and losing by one point to Hamilton, both games in which they held double-digit leads in the fourth quarter. Following the bye week, the team lost their next three, extending their losing streak to five games after opening the season 3-0.

The Riders were heading into the Labour Day Classic needing to find a way to win against the Winnipeg Blue Bombers. They defeated the Blue Bombers 52–0, which was the first time that Winnipeg was shut out in a game since 1969. The Roughriders then defeated Winnipeg again in the Banjo Bowl, winning it by a field goal by Sandro DeAngelis in the last minute, led by backup quarterback Drew Willy after Darian Durant was injured early in the game.

Willy then started in Montreal, but couldn't find a way to win. But Calgary was in Regina the next game, with Durant starting, and this time Chamblin "challenged" the defense to keep Jon Cornish away from the 100-yard mark, or "someone would lose their job". The defense was successful, and so was the offence, as the Roughriders got redemption from the Stampeders, winning 30–25.

The next game was against the defending champion BC Lions, with the season series tied one game apiece. The Roughriders got a huge win at home, with Greg Carr scoring a touchdown, and Weston Dressler, already having the greatest season of his career, snagging two. The team continued their winning streak against Toronto, dominating the Argonauts 36–10. The Roughriders RB Kory Sheets was going for the 1000 yard mark in rushing, in his first season in the CFL. He soon accomplished that, becoming the first Saskatchewan rookie running back to gain 1000 rushing yards since Darren Davis in 2000.

While the Roughriders lost their next two games, they nonetheless qualified for the playoffs after 16 games. A Calgary win over Hamilton gave the Riders a spot in the playoffs, as they were back to the playoffs under Chamblin control. Weston Dressler got his first career punt return touchdown, against Montreal on October 20.

Season standings

Season schedule

Team

Roster

Coaching staff

Playoffs

Schedule

West Semi-Final

References

Saskatchewan Roughriders seasons
Sask